Rineloricaria fallax, sometimes known as the whiptail loricaria, is a species of catfish in the family Loricariidae. It is native to South America, where it occurs in the upper Rupununi and Branco River basins in Brazil and Guyana. Although the species has been reported from Paraguay, this has been determined to be a misidentification. The species reaches 15.7 cm (6.2 inches) in standard length and is believed to be a facultative air-breather. It is known to spawn in caves, with males tending the clutch and assisting the fry in emerging from the eggs.

References 

Loricariini
Fish described in 1915
Catfish of South America
Fish of Brazil
Fish of Guyana